Dylan Sunderland (born 26 February 1996) is an Australian professional racing cyclist, who currently rides for UCI Continental team .

Major results
Sources

2015
 3rd Overall Tour of Tasmania
1st Stage 4
 6th Road race, Oceania Under-23 Road Championships
2016 
 4th Overall Tour of Tasmania
1st  Young rider classification
2017
 4th Overall Tour of Tasmania
 Oceania Road Championships
6th Road race
6th Under-23 time trial
 8th Overall North Star Grand Prix
1st Stage 6
2018
 1st Overall Tour of Tasmania
1st Stage 1
 5th Overall Herald Sun Tour
1st  Young rider classification
2019
 4th Overall Tour de Savoie Mont-Blanc
 5th Road race, National Road Championships
 6th Road race, Oceania Road Championships
 9th Overall Herald Sun Tour
 1st Overall Tour of Tasmania
1st Stage 3

Grand Tour general classification results timeline

References

External links

1996 births
Living people
Australian male cyclists
Cyclists from New South Wales